Francisco Manuel Homem Christo (8 March 1860 – 25 February 1943) was a Portuguese military and political republican. He was distinguished as one of the officers of the Portuguese Army involved in the events surrounding the Anglo-Portuguese Treaty of 1891.

Accused of having betrayed the republican ideals in 1910, he found himself forced into exile in France.

He was the great-great-grandfather of Guy-Manuel de Homem Christo, one half of the former electronic music duo Daft Punk.

Publications
The events of January 31 and my imprisonment
Pro-Patria
Political banditry
Letters from afar: I - Secondary education in Portugal and France
Letters from afar: II - In defense of the instruction of the people
Monarchists and Republicans
Bolshevism in Russia
Notes of my life and my time (7 volumes)

Links
 Francisco Manuel Man Christ , First Faculty of Humanities Faculty of the University of Porto

References

University of Porto
1943 deaths
1860 births
Portuguese military officers
Portuguese politicians